Parts of Animals (or On the Parts of Animals; Greek Περὶ ζῴων μορίων; Latin De Partibus Animalium) is one of Aristotle's major texts on biology. It was written around 350 BC. The whole work is roughly a study in animal anatomy and physiology; it aims to provide a scientific understanding of the parts (organs, tissues, fluids, etc.) of animals and asks whether these parts were designed or arose by chance.

Chronology 
The treaty consists of four books whose authenticity has not been questioned, although its chronology is disputed. The consensus in placing it before the Generation of animals and perhaps later to History of animals. There are indications that Aristotle placed this book at the beginning of his biological works.

Content 
In Book I, Aristotle applies his theory of causality to the study of life forms. Here, he proposed the methodology to study organisms, and emphasized the importance of the final cause, design or purpose seeking a teleological explanation in the life sciences. He criticized the dichotomous taxonomy practiced in Plato's Academy, since much of the time, it is superfluous and “pointless.” He concludes by defending the study of animals as a science as important as that of celestial bodies.

Aristotle affirmed that every living being consists of two intrinsic parts:

 Primary matter (οὐσία)
 Substantial form (εἶδος)

He used those principles to study the primordial elements of the nature of which the bodies of animals are composed and the intrinsic conditions that make bodies become what they are. First they start from the combination of the fundamental elements of nature (earth, water, air and fire) forming tissues and these organs.

In the rest of the books, Aristotle studies the internal and external parts of the blood and non-blood animals, comparing them with human beings, showing the common and the specific.

For Aristotle, the material causes of an organism could not explain all its aspects. To explain phenomena such as the processes an organism or its adaptations to the environment of the organism had to resort to the final causes, teleological explanations of those phenomena. In his Generation of Animals, he explains teleologically reproduction and animal development.

Arabic and Latin translations 
An Arabic translation of Parts of Animals is included as treatises 11–14 of the Kitāb al-Hayawān.

Michael Scot made a Latin translation, and Pedro Gallego a Latin adaptation (Liber de animalibus) made from both the Arabic and Latin versions.

See also

 Generation of Animals
 History of Animals

References

External links
 
 Translation and Commentary by James G. Lennox (Clarendon Press)
 On the Parts of Animals, English translation by William Ogle
 
 De Partibus Animalium, English translation by William Ross and John Smith (Internet Archive)
 Greek text: Hodoi elektronikai (with parallel French translation), Greco interattivo

Works by Aristotle
Zoology books